Charles Russen (9 May 1886 – 16 December 1969) was an Australian cricketer. He played one first-class match for Tasmania in 1910/11.

See also
 List of Tasmanian representative cricketers

References

External links
 

1886 births
1969 deaths
Australian cricketers
Tasmania cricketers
Cricketers from Launceston, Tasmania